Alsancak Hocazade Mosque (Alsancak Hocazade Camii) is a Mosque in İzmir, Turkey.

It is found in the district of Alsancak on the intersection of  Şair Eşref Bulvarı and Ali Çetinkaya Bulvarı. The classical Ottoman styled Mosque was built between 1948 and 1950 by efforts of the  Hocazade Ahmet Ragıp Üzümcü Foundation. The building is mostly white, but the main and cascading domes are blue as are the double balconies of the minarets. The İzmir Municipality and the High Council for Historic Monuments carried out a restoration in 2002

References

1950 establishments in Turkey
Mosques in İzmir
Mosques completed in 1950
1948 architecture
Mosque buildings with domes
20th-century religious buildings and structures in Turkey